Peter Charles Snape, Baron Snape (born 12 February 1942) is a Labour Party politician in the United Kingdom.   He served as Member of Parliament (MP) for West Bromwich East from February 1974 until he stood down in the 2001 election. He is the former Chairman of his hometown football club, Stockport County, as well as being a major shareholder in the club at the time. Lord Snape became Vice-Chairman of the All-Party Parliamentary Group on Speedway Racing in July 2015.

Career
He once lived at Greenwood Gardens, Bredbury and was a railwayman and Bredbury and Romiley Urban District councillor representing Bredbury South ward. He was elected as Labour Member of Parliament for West Bromwich East in 1974, after which he moved to live in Buglawton. He retained links with the Bredbury area, serving for a time as a director of Stockport County Football Club, which he is now once again as of 2010. He held a number of government posts.

He was the member who formally proposed Michael Martin to be the new Speaker in 2000. He stood down in the 2001 election and was created a life peer as Baron Snape, of Wednesbury in the County of West Midlands on 9 June 2004.

Orange juice incident
During the 1992 General Election campaign, Conservative MP Edwina Currie poured a glass of orange juice over Snape shortly after an edition of the Midlands-based debate show Central Weekend had finished airing. Speaking about the incident later, Currie said, "I just looked at my orange juice, and looked at this man from which this stream of abuse was emanating, and thought 'I know how to shut you up.'"

Controversy 
 
In late January 2009 the Sunday Times alleged that Lord Snape was one of four Labour Lords who had agreed to support legislative changes that were favourable to large businesses in exchange for cash. Two of its reporters, posing as lobbyists for a foreign company looking to set up a chain of shops in the UK, approached a range of peers to see if they could be bribed to help the company to obtain an exemption from the Business Rates Supplements Bill. The paper stated Snape agreed to do so in exchange for a fee of £24,000.

The House of Lords Sub-committee on Lords' Interests was asked to report on the matter.  Although the sub-committee found that Lord Snape "expressed a clear willingness to breach the Code of Conduct", the Privileges Committee considered the matter and took further evidence, concluding that he did not "express clear willingness to [act] in return for financial inducement,".

They found no reason to doubt Snape's "assertion that his intention to consult the Registrar before taking any steps was genuine, the meeting with the journalists was on Thursday, and they telephoned him within 24 hours to reveal the sting."
However, they felt his conversation with the journalists "demonstrated an inappropriate attitude to the rules governing the conduct of Members" and they therefore invited him to make a personal statement of apology to the House.

The Sunday Times agreed to publish the findings of the Privileges Committee and agreed to pay a 'substantial sum' towards Lord Snape's legal costs.

Arms

References

External links 

1942 births
Living people
Labour Party (UK) MPs for English constituencies
Labour Party (UK) life peers
National Union of Railwaymen-sponsored MPs
UK MPs 1974
UK MPs 1974–1979
UK MPs 1979–1983
UK MPs 1983–1987
UK MPs 1987–1992
UK MPs 1992–1997
UK MPs 1997–2001
Life peers created by Elizabeth II